Stahovica is a settlement that stretches along the road leading into the upper Kamnik Bistrica Valley in the Municipality of Kamnik in the Upper Carniola region of Slovenia.

References

External links
Stahovica on Geopedia

Populated places in the Municipality of Kamnik